Savitri Devi Mukherji (born Maximiani Julia Portas, ; 30 September 1905 – 22 October 1982) was a French-born Greek fascist, Nazi sympathizer, and spy who served the Axis powers by committing acts of espionage against the Allied forces in India.  She was later a leading member of the Neo-Nazi underground during the 1960s.

Savitri was a proponent of a synthesis of Hinduism and Nazism, proclaiming Adolf Hitler to have been an avatar of the Hindu god Vishnu. She depicted Hitler as a sacrifice for humanity that would lead to the end of the worst World Age, the Kali Yuga, which she believed was induced by the Jews, whom she saw as the powers of evil.

Her writings have influenced neo-Nazism and Nazi occultism. Rejecting Judaism and Christianity, she believed in a form of pantheistic monism, a single cosmos of nature composed of divine energy-matter. Within neo-Nazism, she promoted occultism, ecology, and the New Age movement, and more contemporaneously, she has influenced the alt-right. She also influenced the Chilean diplomat Miguel Serrano. In 1982, Franco Freda published a German translation of her work Gold in the Furnace, and the fourth volume of his annual review, Risguardo (1980–), was devoted to Savitri Devi as the "missionary of Aryan Paganism".

Savitri was an associate in the post-war years of Françoise Dior, Otto Skorzeny, Johann von Leers, and Hans-Ulrich Rudel. She was also one of the founding members of the World Union of National Socialists.

Early years
Born as Maximiani Julia Portas in 1905 in Lyon, Savitri Devi was the daughter of Maxim Portas, a French citizen of Greek descent and an English woman of Italian descent, Julia Portas (née Nash). Maximine Portas was born two and a half months premature, weighing only , and was not at first expected to live. She formed her political views early. From childhood and throughout her life, she was a passionate advocate for animal rights. Her earliest political affiliations were with Greek nationalism.

Portas studied philosophy and chemistry, earning two master's degrees and a PhD in philosophy from the University of Lyon. She next traveled to Greece, and surveyed the legendary ruins. Here, she became familiar with Heinrich Schliemann's discovery of swastikas in Anatolia. Her conclusion was that the Ancient Greeks were Aryan in origin. Her first two books were her doctoral dissertations: Essai-critique sur Théophile Kaïris (Critical Essay on Theophilos Kairis) (Lyon: Maximine Portas, 1935) and La simplicité mathématique (Mathematical Simplicity) (Lyon: Maximine Portas, 1935).

Nazism
In early 1928, she renounced her French citizenship and acquired Greek nationality. Joining a pilgrimage to Palestine during Lent in 1929, Portas decided that she was a Nazi.

In 1932, she traveled to India in search of a living pagan Aryan culture, believing that the country represented "the best of racial segregation." Formally adhering to Hinduism, she took the name Savitri Devi (Hindi: सावित्री देवी; which means "Sun-rays Goddess" in Sanskrit). She volunteered to work at the Hindu Mission as an advocate against Judaism and Christianity, and wrote A Warning to the Hindus in order to offer her support for Hindu nationalism and independence, and rally resistance to the spread of Christianity and Islam in India. During the 1930s, she distributed pro-Axis propaganda and engaged in intelligence gathering on the British in India. She claimed that, during World War II, she enabled Subhas Chandra Bose (the leader of the Axis-affiliated Indian National Army) to contact representatives of the Empire of Japan.

World War II

During World War II, Devi's connection to the Axis powers led to a clash with her mother, who served with the French Resistance during the German occupation of France. In 1940, Devi married Asit Krishna Mukherji, a Bengali Brahmin with Nazi views who edited the pro-German newspaper New Mercury. During 1941, Devi chose to interpret Allied military support for Greece, against Italian and German forces, as an invasion of Greece. Devi and Mukherji continued to gather intelligence for the Axis cause. This included entertaining Allied personnel, which gave Devi and Mukherji an opportunity to question them about military matters. The information which they gathered was passed on to Japanese intelligence officials and the Japanese military found it useful when they launched attacks against Allied airbases and army units.

Post-war Nazi activism

After World War II, she travelled to Europe in late 1945 under the name Savitri Devi Mukherji as the wife of a British subject from India, with a British Indian passport. She briefly stopped in England, then she visited her mother in France, and then she traveled to Iceland, where she witnessed the eruption of Mount Hekla on 5–6 April 1947. She briefly returned to England, then she traveled to Sweden, where she met Sven Hedin.

On 15 June 1948, she boarded the Nord-Express and traveled from Denmark to Germany, where she distributed thousands of copies of handwritten leaflets in which she encouraged the "Men and women of Germany" to "hold fast to our glorious National Socialist faith, and resist!" She recounted her experience in Gold in the Furnace (which was re-edited and released as Gold in the Furnace: Experiences in Post-War Germany to coincide with the hundredth anniversary of her birth).

Arrested for posting bills, she was tried in Düsseldorf on 5 April 1949 for the promotion of Nazi ideas on German territory as a subject of the Allied Control Council, and sentenced to two years imprisonment. She served eight months in Werl Prison, where she befriended her fellow Nazi and SS prisoners (recounted in Defiance), before she was released and expelled from Germany. She then went to stay in Lyon, France.

In April 1953, she obtained a Greek passport in her maiden name in order to re-enter Germany, and while she was there, she went on a pilgrimage, as she called it, to Nazi "holy" sites. She flew from Athens to Rome and then she traveled by rail over the Brenner Pass into "Greater Germany", which she regarded as "the spiritual home of all racially conscious modern Aryans". She traveled to a number of sites which were significant in the life of Adolf Hitler and the history of the  Nazi Party (NSDAP), as well as German nationalist and heathen monuments, as recounted in her 1958 book Pilgrimage.

Savitri Devi became a friend of Hans-Ulrich Rudel, and she completed her manuscript of The Lightning and the Sun at his home in March 1956. Through his introductions, she was able to meet a number of Nazi émigrés in Spain and the Middle East. In 1957, she visited Johann von Leers in Egypt and traveled across the Middle East before she returned to her home in New Delhi, making stops in Beirut, Damascus, Baghdad, Tehran, and Zahedan. In 1961 she stayed with Otto Skorzeny in Madrid.

Savitri Devi took employment teaching in France during the 1960s, spending her summer holidays with friends at Berchtesgaden. In the spring of 1961, while she was on her Easter holiday in London, she learned about the existence of the original British National Party. This group emerged after the Second World War when a handful of former members of the British Union of Fascists took on the name. (The original BNP was quickly absorbed into the Union Movement – it has no direct connection to the present-day BNP.) She met the British National Party's president Andrew Fountaine. Beginning a correspondence with Colin Jordan, she became a devoted supporter of the National Socialist Movement.

In August 1962, Savitri Devi attended the international Nazi conference in Gloucestershire and she was also a founder-signatory of the Cotswold Agreement which established the World Union of National Socialists (WUNS). At this conference she met, and was greatly impressed by, George Lincoln Rockwell. When Rockwell became the leader of the WUNS, he appointed William Luther Pierce the editor of its new magazine: National Socialist World (1966–68). Along with articles by Jordan and Rockwell, Pierce devoted nearly eighty pages of the first issue of the magazine to a condensed edition of The Lightning and the Sun. Because of the enthusiastic response, Pierce included chapters from Gold in the Furnace and Defiance in subsequent issues.

After retiring from teaching in 1970, Savitri Devi spent nine months at the Normandy home of her close friend Françoise Dior while she was working on her memoirs; although she was welcome at first, her annoying personal habits began to disrupt life at the presbytery (among her habits, she did not take baths during her stay and she continually chewed garlic).  Concluding that her pension would go much further in India and encouraged by Françoise Dior, she flew from Paris to Bombay on 23 June 1971. In August, she moved to New Delhi, where she lived alone, with a number of cats and at least one cobra.

Savitri Devi continued to correspond with Nazi enthusiasts in Europe and the Americas, particularly with Colin Jordan, John Tyndall, Matt Koehl, Miguel Serrano, Einar Åberg and Ernst Zündel. She was the first person to tell Zündel of her claim that the Nazi genocide of the Jews was untrue; he proposed a series of taped interviews (conducted in November 1978) and published a new illustrated edition of The Lightning and the Sun in 1979.

Animal rights activism
Devi was an animal rights activist, as well as a vegetarian from a young age, and she also espoused ecologist views in her works. She wrote The Impeachment of Man in 1959 in India in which she espoused her views on animal rights and nature. According to her, human beings do not stand above the animals; in her ecologist views, humans are a part of the ecosystem and as a result, they should respect all life, including animals and the whole of nature.

She always held radical views with regard to vegetarianism and believed that  people who do not "respect nature or animals" should be executed. She also believed that vivisection, circuses, slaughter and fur industries among others do not belong in a civilized society.

Death
By the late 1970s, she had developed cataracts and her eyesight was rapidly deteriorating as a result. Myriam Hirn, a clerk from the French embassy in India, looked after her, making regular house visits. She decided to leave India, returning to Germany to live in Bavaria in 1981 before re-moving to France in 1982.

Savitri eventually died in 1982 in Sible Hedingham, Essex, England, at a friend's home. The cause of her death was recorded as a heart attack and coronary thrombosis. She was en route to lecture in the United States at the invitation of Matthias Koehl at the time of her death. Devi's ashes were shipped to the headquarters of the American Nazi Party in Arlington, Virginia, where they were purportedly placed next to those of George Lincoln Rockwell in a "Nazi hall of honor".

Works

See also

Ecofascism
Esoteric Nazism
Nazi racial theories

Notes

Further reading
 Cooper, Terry. Death by Dior: Françoise Dior. Dynasty Press (2013). .
 Elst, Koenraad. The Saffron Swastika: The Notion of "Hindu Fascism" (chapter 5). "Savitri Devi and the 'Hindu-Aryan Myth'." Voice of India (2001). [2 Vols.] .
 Gardell, Matthias. Gods of the Blood: The Pagan Revival and White Separatism. Duke University Press (2003). .
 Goodrick-Clarke, Nicholas. Hitler's Priestess: Savitri Devi, the Hindu-Aryan Myth, and Neo-Nazism. New York University Press (1998). .
 Goodrick-Clarke, Nicholas. "Savitri Devi and the Hitler Avatar" (Chapter 5). In: Black Sun: Aryan Cults, Esoteric Nazism and the Politics of Identity. New York University Press (2002). ; (2003). .
 Kaplan, Jeffrey (editor). Encyclopedia of White Power: A Sourcebook on the Radical Racist Right. Altamira Press (2000). .

External links

 The Savitri Devi Archive

1905 births
1982 deaths
20th-century French philosophers
20th-century French poets
20th-century Greek philosophers
20th-century French women writers
Antisemitic propaganda
Anti-vivisectionists
Burials in Wisconsin
Converts to Hinduism
Neo-Nazism in the United Kingdom
French animal rights activists
French autobiographers
French collaborators with Nazi Germany
20th-century French criminals
French environmentalists
French expatriates in India
French Hindus
French neo-Nazis
French people of English descent
French people of Greek descent
French people of Italian descent
French political writers
French religious writers
20th-century travel writers
French travel writers
Greek autobiographers
Greek collaborators with Nazi Germany
Greek environmentalists
Greek neo-Nazis
Greek people of English descent
Greek people of French descent
Greek people of Italian descent
Greek political writers
Greek religious writers
Greek travel writers
Hindu mystics
Hindu nationalism
Indian independence activists
Hindu writers
Nazi propagandists
Occultism in Nazism
New Age writers
Non-fiction environmental writers
Pantheists
People deported from Germany
People from Lyon
People from New Delhi
Pseudonymous women writers
University of Lyon alumni
Visva-Bharati University alumni
Women autobiographers
Women religious writers
Indian women travel writers
World War II spies for Germany
World War II spies for Japan
World War II spies for Italy
Indian travel writers
Indian women non-fiction writers
Women biographers
20th-century Indian biographers
20th-century Indian women writers
Writers from Delhi
Hindu female religious leaders
20th-century pseudonymous writers
Prisoners and detainees of the British military